Storm Watch is a 2002 American science fiction film, directed by Terry Cunningham and starring Adrian Paul and Bai Ling. The music was composed by Sean Murray. The film centers on a protagonist who plays a virtual reality online game, which suddenly turns into a race against time to stop a weather satellite from destroying the world. The film was released on DVD and VHS under the title Code Hunter.

Storm Watch features special effect scenes reused from the films Virus, End of Days, and Set It Off.  Clips from Virus include the alien energy hitting the Russian ship (in Storm Watch, it is lightning hitting a decommissioned ship the Army uses for a target); and the "Sea Star" tug boat caught in the storm (shot to be a natural storm, in this film it is artificial). The entire subway train miniature exteriors are from End of Days. The Chevrolet Impala car chase was lifted from Set It Off.

External links
 

American science fiction films
2002 science fiction films
2002 films
CineTel Films films
2000s English-language films
2000s American films